Proti všem is a Czech novel, written by Alois Jirásek. It was first published in 1893 and deals with the Hussite Wars. It was adapted into the film Against All in 1956.

1893 novels
Novels set in the 14th century
Novels set in the 15th century
Novels by Alois Jirásek
Cultural depictions of Jan Žižka
Hussite Wars in popular culture